Nigooda Rahasya (Kannada: ನಿಗೂಢ ರಹಸ್ಯ) is a 1990 Indian Kannada suspense thriller film,  directed by  Perala and produced by Jagadish Malnad and Kashinath Chindupurge. The film stars Shankar Nag, Geetha, Vanitha Vasu and Tara in the lead roles. The film has musical score by Hamsalekha.

The movie was released after the demise of Shankar Nag. His brother Anant Nag dubbed for Shankar's character.

Plot
Mohan, an engineer, is hired by a rich businessman to perfectly finish a large building project. However, much to his amazement, the remote area where he resides happens to be a mysterious one; where some resident disappears on specific days after a long power cut and reappears after a few days on the outskirts of the city as corpse. He also comes across various chilling factors such as a supposed ghost, a haunted house, a gang of men who disappears in a matter of seconds and a powerful monster. The rest of the movie deals with Mohan's journey to bring out the truth.

Cast

Shankar Nag Mohan (Voice dubbed by Anant Nag)
Geetha Deepa and Roopa (Dual Role)
Vanitha Vasu Rohini
Tara
Doddanna
Sudheer
K. S. Ashwath
Sadashiva Brahmavar
Ramesh Bhat
Mysore Lokesh
Sihi Kahi Chandru
Umashree
Kaminidharan
Lohithaswa
Rathnakar
Shringar Nagaraj
Lalitha
Seema
Kala
Baby Rashmi
Baby Lakshmi
Master Sanju
Ramamurthy
Srishailan
Ramachandra
Smt Ramachandra
Chikkanna
Ramesh Pandith

Soundtrack

References

1990 films
1990s Kannada-language films